Duane George Bray (born September 24, 1954) is a Canadian former professional ice hockey player who played in the World Hockey Association (WHA). Bray played part of the 1976–77 WHA season with the Phoenix Roadrunners. He was drafted in the eleventh round of the 1974 NHL amateur draft by the Minnesota North Stars. Bray was born in Flin Flon, Manitoba, but grew up in Hamiota, Manitoba.

References

External links

1954 births
Living people
Canadian ice hockey defencemen
Des Moines Capitols players
Flin Flon Bombers players
Ice hockey people from Manitoba
Minnesota North Stars draft picks
Oklahoma City Blazers (1965–1977) players
People from Flin Flon
People from Westman Region, Manitoba
Phoenix Roadrunners (WHA) players
Tucson Mavericks players
Tulsa Oilers (1964–1984) players
Victoria Cougars (WHL) players
Western International Hockey League players
Canadian expatriate ice hockey players in the United States